Live in Boston is a triple CD live album by American rock band the Doors released in 2007. It was recorded at the Boston Arena on April 10, 1970, during the band's Roadhouse Blues Tour. The band performed two shows, one starting at 7 pm and a second scheduled for 10 but not actually starting until past midnight. Jim Morrison appears to be intoxicated during the entire latter show, and continued drinking heavily throughout the performance. The late start ended with the venue's owners cutting power to the stage to force the end of the concert.

The album was released from the Bright Midnight Archives collection which contains a number of previously unreleased live concerts by the Doors.

Background
Ray Manzarek, the band's keyboardist recalls the concert as "manic, wild, crazy, intoxicated", adding:

Track listing

Disc 1
 1st show, 7 p.m.
 "Start" – (0:07)
 "All Right, All Right, All Right" - (0:10)
 "Roadhouse Moan" – (1:33)
 "Roadhouse Blues" (Jim Morrison) – (4:56)
 "Ship of Fools" (Morrison) - (6:27)
 "Alabama Song (Whisky Bar)" (Bertolt Brecht, Kurt Weill) (2:02)
 "Back Door Man" (Willie Dixon, Chester Burnett) (2:16)
 "Five to One" (Morrison) (9:09)
 "When the Music's Over" (14:45)
 "Rock Me" (B.B. King) (7:14)
 "Mystery Train" (Junior Parker) (7:18)
 "Away in India" (1:54)
 "Crossroads" (Robert Johnson) (5:15)
 "Prelude to 'Wake Up!'" (0:48)
 "Wake Up!" (Morrison) (1:33)
 "Light My Fire" (Krieger, Morrison) (12:32)

Disc 2
 2nd show, 10 p.m.
 "Start" (1:22)
 "Break On Through (To the Other Side)" (Morrison) (8:12)
 "I Believe in Democracy" (0:33)
 "When the Music's Over" (14:19)
 "Roadhouse Blues" (Morrison) (5:53)
 "The Spy" (Morrison) (5:43)
 "Alabama Song (Whisky Bar)" (Brecht, Weill) (1:40)
 "Back Door Man" (Dixon, Burnett) (2:27)
 "Five to One" (Morrison) (7:06)
 "Astrology Rap" (0:45)
 "Build Me a Woman" (Morrison) (3:57)
 "You Make Me Real" (Morrison) (3:26)
 "Wait a Minute!" (0:44)
 "Mystery Train" (Parker) (7:52)
 "Away in India" (2:52)
 "Crossroads" (Johnson) (3:31)

Disc 3
 2nd show, 10 p.m. (cont.)
 "Band Intros" (0:35)
 "Adolf Hitler" (Morrison) (0:23)
 "Light My Fire" (Krieger, Morrison) (5:47)
 "Fever" ["Light My Fire" Cont'd] (0:23)
 "Summertime" ["Light My Fire" Cont'd] (7:29)
 "St. James Infirmary Blues" ["Light My Fire" Cont'd] (0:46)
 "Graveyard Poem" ["Light My Fire" Cont'd] (1:13)
 "Light My Fire" [Reprise] (Krieger) (2:11)
 "More, More, More!" (0:19)
 "Ladies & Gentlemen" (0:13)
 "We Can't Instigate" (0:13)
 "They Want More" (1:16)
 "Been Down So Long" (Morrison) (6:13)
 "Power Turned Off" (9:15)

Personnel
Jim Morrison – vocals
Ray Manzarek – organ, keyboard bass, electric guitar on "Been Down So Long"
Robby Krieger – electric guitar, bass guitar on "Been Down So Long"
John Densmore – drums

References

2007 live albums
Albums produced by Bruce Botnick
Bright Midnight Archives